Massawa International Airport  is an airport in Massawa, a major city in the Northern Red Sea region of Eritrea. It is considered to be the successor of the Otumlo Airport, also in Massawa, which was destroyed in 1941.

Overview
The Massawa International Airport is a large establishment. It is one of Eritrea's major airports.

In the colonial period in Italian Eritrea, a 1,970 km airway line was established between Massawa-Djibouti-Berbera-Galadi-Mogadishu.

As of 2014, the airport accommodated only domestic flights since the companies that formed it do not have international licenses.

The Eritrea Investment Centre has proposed a new $60 million development project at the airport. Additionally, it has offered incentives on taxation, provision of supplies that the market does not already provide, provision of heavy machinery, and easy access to government loans.

Airlines
There are no active airlines operating from Massawa.

Nasair 2006-2014
BurkinaUruka 2009-2011
Eritrean Air Force still uses the airport as one of their three airbases.

Notes

References
Massawa International Airport (MSW)

Massawa
Airports in Eritrea